Dirk D. Smith is a retired United States Air Force major general who served as the Vice Director for Joint Force Development of the Joint Staff. Previously, he was the Deputy Commander for Operations and Intelligence of the Combined Joint Task Force.

References

External links

Year of birth missing (living people)
Living people
Place of birth missing (living people)
United States Air Force generals